Pointed Heels is a 1929 American pre-Code early sound musical comedy film from Paramount Pictures that was directed by A. Edward Sutherland and starring William Powell, Helen Kane, Richard "Skeets" Gallagher, and Fay Wray. This film was originally filmed in color sequences by Technicolor, but today those color sequences only survive in black-and-white. One of these color sequences was the "Pointed Heels" ballet with Albertina Rasch and her Dancers.

The UCLA Film and Television Archive has a complete copy of this film with all color sequences, but has not released it to anyone. Turner Classic Movies airs the black-and-white television copy of this film. A print screened at the Hammer Museum in Los Angeles in 2009 contained the color ballet sequence. Universal owns the copyright and has not allowed a release of the restored version on TCM or Blu-Ray.

Plot

Cast
William Powell as Robert Courtland
Helen Kane as Dorothea 'Dot' Nixon
Fay Wray as Lora Nixon
Richard "Skeets" Gallagher as Dash Nixon
Phillips Holmes as Donald Ogden
Eugene Pallette as Joe Carrington
Adrienne Dore as Kay Wilcox
Albertina Rasch Dancers as Themselves (uncredited)
Virginia Bruce as Chorus Girl (uncredited)

Production
A silent version of the film was released in the United States.

See also
List of early color feature films

References

External links

Films directed by A. Edward Sutherland
1929 films
1920s color films
Paramount Pictures films
American musical comedy films
1929 musical comedy films
Films with screenplays by Florence Ryerson
1920s English-language films
1920s American films